Buguruslan is a town in Orenburg Oblast, Russia. Population:

History
It was founded in 1748.

Administrative and municipal status
Within the framework of administrative divisions, Buguruslan serves as the administrative center of Buguruslansky District, even though it is not a part of it. As an administrative division, it is, together with six rural localities, incorporated separately as the Town of Buguruslan—an administrative unit with the status equal to that of the districts. As a municipal division, the Town of Buguruslan is incorporated as Buguruslan Urban Okrug.

References

Citations

General sources

External links
Official website of Buguruslan 
Buguruslan Business Directory 

Cities and towns in Orenburg Oblast
Buguruslansky Uyezd